TTV (Twoja Telewizja TV) is the first Polish, social-intervention television channel. It was launched on January 2, 2012. TTV broadcasts of a news and entertainment programs. The channel cooperates with TVN 24.

History
In September 2011, Stavka and the TVN Group concluded an agreement on a close cooperation in the field of technology, advertising and programming. Originally, the channel was supposed to broadcast under the name U-TV, but the broadcaster requested before the launch to change the record in the concession received. The head of the station was Lidia Kazen. On February 1, 2012 the station was encrypted via satellite. On the same day the channel joined the Cyfrowy Polsat mux. On December 19, 2014 TTV was launched in Warsaw in HD quality on the Digital Terrestrial TV test multiplex (with TVN 7 in HD quality).

Programming

References

External links
 

Television channels in Poland
Television channels and stations established in 2012
2012 establishments in Poland
Polish-language television stations
Mass media in Warsaw
TVN (Polish TV channel)